The 2022 P. League+ playoffs was the postseason tournament of the 2021–22 P. League+ season. The playoffs was originally scheduled to begin on May 21 but was postponed until June 3 due to the conflict with the extended regular season, while four rescheduled games were remaining on May 21.

Format
The top four seed qualify the playoffs. All seeds will play the best-of-five playoffs series, which is in a 2-2-1 format. The winners advance and play in the best-of-seven finals series, which is in a 2-2-1-1-1 format. The seeding is based on each team's regular season record. Home court advantage goes to the higher seed for both series.

Playoff qualifying
On April 9, 2022, the New Taipei Kings became the first team to clinch a playoff spot. On May 21, the Hsinchu JKO Lioneers clinched the regular season title.

Bracket

Bold Series winner
Italic Team with home-court advantage

Playoffs: (1) Hsinchu JKO Lioneers vs. (4) New Taipei Kings

Playoffs: (2) Formosa Taishin Dreamers vs. (3) Taipei Fubon Braves

P. League+ Finals: (1) Hsinchu JKO Lioneers vs. (3) Taipei Fubon Braves

References

Playoffs
P. League+ playoffs
2022 in Taiwanese sport
P. League+